Punya Bhoomi Naa Desam is a 1994 Telugu film directed by A. Kodandarami Reddy and produced by Mohan Babu under the banner of his production company Sri Lakshmi Prasanna Pictures. It stars Mohan Babu and Meena in lead roles, while Dasari Narayana Rao, Gollapudi Maruti Rao, Annapoorna, Brahmanandam and Babu Mohan played other pivotal roles. The film is a remake of the Hindi film Krantiveer.

Cast
 Mohan Babu as Bharath
 Meena as Swathi
 Dasari Narayana Rao as Bangaraiah
 Raj Kumar as Bangaraiah's son
 Subhashri
 Annapoorna
 Brahmanandam
 Babu Mohan
 Gollapudi Maruthi Rao
 Narra Venkateswara Rao
 AVS
 M. S. Narayana
 Manchu Manoj as child Bharath

Production
Mohan Babu's younger son Manoj Manchu played as a child artist in the film. He portrayed as the younger version of his father's character. He was well appreciated for his role.

Soundtrack
All music was composed by Bappi Lahiri.

 "Pahadarella Redu" (Singers: S.P. Balasubrahmanyam, K. S. Chitra)
 "Toorupulona Suryudu" (Singers: S.P. Balasubrahmanyam, K. S. Chitra)
 "Jai Durga" (Singers: S.P. Balasubrahmanyam, K. S. Chitra)
 "Abbaya Chesuko Pelli" (Singers: S. P. Balasubrahmanyam)
 "Bharataa Desamaa" (Singers: S. P. Balasubrahmanyam)
 "Teenage Sweety Beauty" (Singers: S. P. Balasubrahmanyam, K. S. Chitra)

References

External links

1994 films
1990s Telugu-language films
Films directed by A. Kodandarami Reddy
Films scored by Bappi Lahiri
Telugu remakes of Hindi films